Gregory Darnell Smith (born January 28, 1947) is an American retired basketball player.

Smith was born in Princeton, Kentucky and played college basketball at Western Kentucky University and was drafted by the Kentucky Colonels in the 1968 American Basketball Association draft and by the Milwaukee Bucks in the fourth round of the 1968 NBA draft.

Smith played forward for the Milwaukee Bucks (1968–71), Houston Rockets (1971–72) and Portland Trail Blazers (1972–75).

He helped the Bucks win the 1970–71 NBA Championship and the 1971–72 NBA Midwest Division. He was traded from the Houston Rockets to the Portland Trail Blazers for Stan McKenzie on October 27, 1972.

In 8 seasons Smith played in 524 games and had 12,269 minutes played. He had a .482 field goal percentage (1,737 for 3,607), and a .646 free throw percentage (623 for 965). He recorded 3,249 total rebounds, 969 assists, 1,553 personal fouls and 4,097 points.

NBA career statistics

Regular season

|-
| align="left" | 1968–69
| align="left" | Milwaukee
| 79 || - || 27.9 || .450 || - || .587 || 10.2 || 1.7 || - || - || 8.1
|-
| align="left" | 1969–70
| align="left" | Milwaukee
| style="background:#cfecec;"| 82* || - || 28.9 || .511 || - || .718 || 8.7 || 1.9 || - || - || 9.8
|-
| style="text-align:left;background:#afe6ba;" | 1970–71†
| align="left" | Milwaukee
| 82 || - || 29.6 || .512 || - || .662 || 7.2 || 2.8 || - || - || 11.7
|-
| align="left" | 1971–72
| align="left" | Milwaukee
| 28 || - || 26.3 || .490 || - || .707 || 5.8 || 2.3 || - || - || 8.4
|-
| align="left" | 1971–72
| align="left" | Houston
| 54 || - || 28.1 || .448 || - || .636 || 6.0 || 2.9 || - || - || 9.1
|-
| align="left" | 1972–73
| align="left" | Houston
| 4 || - || 10.3 || .313 || - || .000 || 2.0 || 1.3 || - || - || 2.5
|-
| align="left" | 1972–73
| align="left" | Portland
| 72 || - || 21.8 || .488 || - || .586 || 5.2 || 1.6 || - || - || 7.4
|-
| align="left" | 1973–74
| align="left" | Portland
| 67 || - || 13.1 || .434 || - || .608 || 2.8 || 1.2 || 0.6 || 0.1 || 3.7
|-
| align="left" | 1974–75
| align="left" | Portland
| 55 || - || 9.4 || .486 || - || .667 || 1.6 || 0.5 || 0.4 || 0.1 || 3.2
|-
| align="left" | 1975–76
| align="left" | Portland
| 1 || - || 3.0 || .000 || - || .000 || 0.0 || 0.0 || 0.0 || 0.0 || 0.0
|- class="sortbottom"
| style="text-align:center;" colspan="2"| Career
| 524 || - || 23.4 || .482 || - || .646 || 6.2 || 1.8 || 0.5 || 0.1 || 7.8
|}

Playoffs

|-
| align="left" | 1969–70
| align="left" | Milwaukee
| 10 || - || 32.9 || .500 || - || .591 || 8.5 || 2.2 || - || - || 10.7
|-
| style="text-align:left;background:#afe6ba;" | 1970–71†
| align="left" | Milwaukee
| 14 || - || 32.4 || .547 || - || .550 || 8.6 || 2.6 || - || - || 11.6
|- class="sortbottom"
| style="text-align:center;" colspan="2"| Career
| 24 || - || 32.6 || .527 || - || .565 || 8.5 || 2.4 || - || - || 11.2
|}

References

External links
NBA stats @ basketballreference.com

1947 births
Living people
21st-century African-American people
African-American basketball players
American men's basketball players
Basketball players from Kentucky
Houston Rockets players
Kentucky Colonels draft picks
Milwaukee Bucks draft picks
Milwaukee Bucks players
People from Princeton, Kentucky
Portland Trail Blazers players
Power forwards (basketball)
Small forwards
Western Kentucky Hilltoppers basketball players
20th-century African-American sportspeople